Beka Gviniashvili (born 26 October 1995) is a Georgian judoka who became European Junior Champion in 2013, 2014, and 2015 and won the World Junior Championships in 2013 in Ljubljana and in 2015 in Abu Dhabi and EYOF in 2011. He also became the U23 European Championship in 2016 in Tel Aviv. With the Georgian Juniors, he won the World and European titles. He is a promising rising judoka. He placed 5th at the 2015 World Judo Championships in Astana, Kazakhstan after losing in the bronze medal final against one of his colleagues Varlam Liparteliani. He competed at the 2016 Summer Olympics in Rio de Janeiro, in the men's -100 kg category where he placed 7th. He took bronze at the 2017 European Judo Championships U90kg.

In 2021, he won the silver medal in his event at the 2021 Judo World Masters held in Doha, Qatar.

References

External links
 
 
 

Male judoka from Georgia (country)
1995 births
Living people
Judoka at the 2015 European Games
Judoka at the 2019 European Games
European Games medalists in judo
European Games silver medalists for Georgia (country)
Judoka at the 2016 Summer Olympics
Olympic judoka of Georgia (country)
21st-century people from Georgia (country)